Mariana Rojas is a Venezuelan freestyle wrestler. She won the silver medal in the women's 50kg event at the 2022 Bolivarian Games held in Valledupar, Colombia. She also won the silver medal in her event at the 2022 South American Games held in Asunción, Paraguay.

In 2021, she won one of the bronze medals in the women's 53kg event at the Junior Pan American Games held in Cali, Colombia.

She competed in the women's 53kg event at the 2022 U23 World Wrestling Championships held in Pontevedra, Spain.

Achievements

References

External links 
 

Living people
Year of birth missing (living people)
Place of birth missing (living people)
Venezuelan female sport wrestlers
South American Games silver medalists for Venezuela
South American Games medalists in wrestling
Competitors at the 2022 South American Games
21st-century Venezuelan women